The Great Himalayan National Park (GHNP) is a national park in India, located in Kullu region in the state of Himachal Pradesh. The park was established in 1984 and is spread over an area of 1171 km2; elevations within the park range between 1500 and 6000 m. The Great Himalayan National Park is a habitat to numerous flora and more than 375 fauna species, including approximately 31 mammals, 181 birds, 3 reptiles, 9 amphibians, 11 annelids, 17 mollusks and 127 insects. They are protected under the strict guidelines of the Wildlife Protection Act of 1972; hence any sort of hunting is not permitted.

In June 2014, the Great Himalayan National Park was added to the UNESCO list of World Heritage Sites, under the criterion of "outstanding significance for biodiversity conservation".

Biogeography
The GHNP is at the junction of world's two major biogeographic realms: the Indomalayan realm to the south and the Palearctic realm to the north. The temperate forest flora-fauna of GHNP represents the westernmost extension of the Sino-Japanese Region. The high elevation ecosystem of the Northwest Himalaya has common plant elements with the adjacent Western and Central Asiatic region. As a result of its 4,100 m elevation range the park has a diversity of zones with their representative flora and fauna, such as alpine, glacial, temperate, and subtropical forests.

These biogeographic elements are result of geological evolution of Himalaya which continues today from the action of plate tectonics and continental drift. Over 100 million years ago, the Indian sub-continent broke off from the large, southern landmass, Gondwanaland and moved north. It eventually slammed into the northern land mass, Laurasia, and formed the gigantic folded mountains of the Himalaya. Due to this union of Gondwanaland and Asiatic landmasses, exchange of flora and fauna was possible and this ultimately led to the unique biogeographical features in the region.

Timeline of creation
It took twenty years from inception to inauguration for GHNP to be realized as part of the Indian national park system. The following is a brief timeline:

1980: Preliminary park survey of the watersheds of Tirthan, Sainj, and Jiwanal in Banjar area of Kullu district 1983: Continued park survey, the Banjar area of Kullu district.

1984: Notification by state of Himachal Pradesh of the intention to create the Great Himalayan National Park with buffer zone.

1987: First Management Plan of the Great Himalayan National Park.

1988: Settlement Proceedings and settling of rights of local communities

1992: The Himachal Wildlife Project re-assesses wildlife abundance, livestock grazing, and herb collection and reviewed the existing management plan.

1994: The Government of HP revised the Notification of intention to include the Sainj Wildlife Sanctuary and the upper Parvati watershed.

1994-1999: Conservation of Biodiversity Project (CoB), the Wildlife Institute of India, Dehradun conducts research to assist in the management of the park.

1999: Declaration of Award upon Completion of Settlement Proceedings. Monetary compensation for individuals who had rights of forest produce in the park area, including a package for providing alternative income generation activities to everybody living in the Eco-development Project Area or Ecozone. The GHNP becomes the latest and newest national park of India. The Conservation of Biodiversity (CoB) Project completed on 31 December 1999.

2014: World Heritage Natural Site status conferred on GHNP on 23 June in the proceedings of the 38th World Heritage Committee meeting in Doha, Qatar.

Biodiversity

Fauna

The Great Himalayan National Park is home to more than 375 faunal species. So far species of 31 mammals, 181 birds, 3 reptiles, 9 amphibians, 11 annelids, 17 mollusks and 127 insects belonging to six orders have been identified and documented. Most of the Himalayan fauna has been given protection under the high priority protection category of Schedule I of the Indian Wildlife (Protection) Act, 1972. The state government of Himachal Pradesh has banned hunting in the state for more than ten years.  A trek of 35 to 45 km in any of the park's valleys brings one into the high elevation habitat (3,500 m and above) of animals such as blue sheep, snow leopard, Himalayan brown bear, Himalayan tahr, and musk deer. Best sightings can be made in autumn (September–November) as animals start their seasonal migration to lower elevations.

Flora
The GHNP also supports a great diversity of plant life, thanks to its wide elevation range and relatively undisturbed habitats. From the lofty pines and spruces and the great, spreading horse chestnuts of the lower valleys, to the dense cushions and prostrate branches of the alpine herbs and junipers, the park presents an endless variety of vegetation. Although some areas have been modified by grazing, this is one of the few areas of the Western Himalayas where the forests and alpine meadows can be seen in something approaching their original state. The subalpine zone is richest in species, followed by the alpine and upper temperate zones.

Trekking and tourism 
In the recent years, the GHNP has emerged as a popular trekking and ecotourism destination. The GHNP office at Sai Ropa issues permits for the treks. There are several popular trekking routes in the park, ranging from those that can be done in a day or two, to those that can take up from a week to ten days. Ecotourism and homestay tourism has also being gaining popularity in places outside but near to the park.

See also 

 Pandey, Sanjeeva and Tony Gaston. 2019. Great Himalayan National Park: The Struggle to Save the Western Himalayas. New Delhi: Niyogi Books. 
 https://www.greathimalayannationalpark.org/

References 

Geography of Kullu district
National parks in Himachal Pradesh
Protected areas established in 1984
World Heritage Sites in India
1984 establishments in Himachal Pradesh
Western Himalayan subalpine conifer forests